José Welison da Silva (born 11 March 1995), known as Zé Welison, is a Brazilian professional footballer who plays as a defensive midfielder for Fortaleza.

Club career

Vitória
Born in São Pedro, Rio Grande do Norte, Zé Welison joined Vitória's youth setup in 2011, from ABC. At the former, he won the Copa do Brasil Sub-20 in 2012, and was promoted to the first team in the 2014 season.

Zé Welison made his senior debut on 23 January 2014, starting and scoring his team's third in a 3–1 Copa do Nordeste away win against Confiança. On 26 February, he renewed his contract until the end of 2018.

Zé Welison was named in the Best XI of the 2014 Campeonato Baiano, and was elected the Best Newcomer of the tournament. He made his Série A debut on 19 April, playing the full 90 minutes in a 1–0 away loss against Internacional.

Zé Welison scored his first goal in the top tier on 27 April 2014, netting his team's second in a 2–2 home draw against Atlético Paranaense. He was a regular starter during his first season, as his side suffered relegation, but subsequently suffered injuries which kept him out for several months of competition.

Atlético Mineiro
On 28 June 2018, Zé Welison joined Atlético Mineiro on loan for the remainder of the season. The following 7 January, he transferred to the club on a permanent basis, signing a five-year contract. 

Regularly used during the 2018 and 2019 campaigns, Zé Welison was deemed surplus to requirements at Galo after the arrival of Jorge Sampaoli.

International career
Zé Welison was a part of the Brazil under-20 side that won the 2014 Panda Cup in China. In that year, he also featured for the under-21s in some friendlies.

Career statistics

Honours
Vitória
Campeonato Baiano: 2016, 2017
Copa do Brasil Sub-20: 2012

Atlético Mineiro
Campeonato Mineiro: 2020

Fortaleza
Copa do Nordeste: 2022
Campeonato Cearense: 2022

International
Brazil U20
Panda Cup: 2014

Individual
Campeonato Baiano Team of The Tournament: 2014
Campeonato Baiano Best Newcomer: 2014

References

External links

1995 births
Living people
Sportspeople from Rio Grande do Norte
Brazilian footballers
Association football midfielders
Campeonato Brasileiro Série A players
Campeonato Brasileiro Série B players
Esporte Clube Vitória players
Clube Atlético Mineiro players
Botafogo de Futebol e Regatas players
Sport Club do Recife players
Fortaleza Esporte Clube players
Brazil youth international footballers
Brazil under-20 international footballers